Cloxestradiol acetate (brand name Genovul), also known as 17-(2,2,2-trichloroethoxy)estradiol O,O-diacetate, is a synthetic steroidal estrogen derived from estradiol. It is the O,O-diacetate ester of cloxestradiol, which, in contrast to cloxestradiol acetate, was never marketed.

See also
 List of estrogen esters § Estradiol esters
 Cloxotestosterone acetate

References

Abandoned drugs
Acetate esters
Estradiol esters
Estranes
Estrogen esters
Estrogen ethers
Organochlorides
Synthetic estrogens
Trichloromethyl compounds